Padre Burgos, officially the Municipality of Padre Burgos, is a 5th class municipality in the province of Southern Leyte, Philippines. According to the 2020 census, it has a population of 11,159 people.

Padre Burgos is named after Fr. José Burgos, one of the martyred priests collectively called Gomburza. The town is being surrounded by Sogod Bay in the East, Padre Burgos was once called "Tamulayag", a vernacular slang which means "Let's go fishing". Fishing is the main livelihood in the town.

The town is famous for its white-sand beaches such as the Tangkaan Beach, from where Limasawa Island can be seen; the Likay-Likay Beach, where you can go fishing and snorkelling; the Bukana which is like a small swam of water and serve as a home of many fishes in Buenavista, the floating Balsa of Bas. And the beaches in Barangay Lungsodaan. Padre Burgos is also famous to diving enthusiasts, the underwater beauty boasts of many colourful clusters of corals. With the Local Government's cooperation, Coral Cay, a foreign non-profit organization established its offices in Barangay Tangkaan whose main purpose is to provide help among local people to maintain fish sanctuaries, awareness programs on ocean-life preservation, and clean-up activities on the shorelines of Padre Burgos.

Padre Burgos is also known for its "budbod" (suman), a very sweet sticky-rice.

History
Padre Burgos was converted to a municipality from portions of Malitbog and Macrohon through Executive Order No. 265 signed by President Carlos P. Garcia on August 29, 1957.

Geography

Barangays
Padre Burgos is politically subdivided into 11 barangays.
 Buenavista
 Bunga
 Cantutang
 Dinahugan
 Laca
 Lungsodaan
 Poblacion
 San Juan
 Santa Sofia
 Santo Rosario
 Tangkaan

Climate

Demographics

Religion
Majority of the population is Philippine Independent Church (IFI), while others belong to Roman Catholic, Hosanna Assembly of God, The Church of Jesus Christ of Latter-Day Saints (Mormons), Iglesia ni Cristo, UCCP, among others.

List of Churches:
 Roman Catholic Church, Poblacion. Holy Mass every day. Monday & Friday 5:30 pm; Tuesday & Thursday 5:30 am. Sunday 5:30 am.
 Iglesia Filipina Independiente, Barangay Santa Sofia
 Hosanna Chapel Philippines (AG), Barangay Poblacion
 United Church of Christ in the Philippines, Barangay Poblacion
 Philippine Independent Church, Barangay Poblacion
 The Church of Jesus Christ of Latter-Day Saints (Mormons), Barangay Cantutang
 Iglesia ni Cristo, Barangay Cantutang

Economy

Tourism
 Peter's Dive Resort
 Tangkaan Beach
 Michael's Resort and Dive
 Sogod Bay Scuba Resort
 Padre Burgos Castle Resort

References

External links
 Padre Burgos Profile at PhilAtlas.com
 [ Philippine Standard Geographic Code]
Philippine Census Information
Local Governance Performance Management System

Municipalities of Southern Leyte
Establishments by Philippine executive order